The St. Anthony's Church or St. Anthony's Shrine is the cathedral church of the Roman Catholic Diocese of Kandy in Wahacotte.

The church is one of the most sacred pilgrim places for Catholics in Sri Lanka and a national shrine. The Benedictine mission is attached to the church.

References

External links 
Wahakotte St. Anthony's Church annual feast 
Historical Wahakotte church 

Churches in Matale District
Roman Catholic churches in Sri Lanka
Roman Catholic shrines in Sri Lanka